Cliffe and Cliffe Woods is a civil parish in the borough of Medway in Kent, England. The parish is located on the Hoo Peninsula and comprises the villages  of Cliffe and the suburb, Cliffe Woods. At the 2011 Census the population of the civil parish was 5,370. In the west of the Cliffe and Cliffe Woods parish are the Cliffe Pools.

References

External links
Cliffe and Cliffe Woods Parish Council

Civil parishes in Kent